Richard Carle (born Charles Nicholas Carleton, July 7, 1871 – June 28, 1941) was an American stage and film actor as well as a playwright and stage director.  He appeared in more than 130 films between 1915 and 1941.

Carle was born in Somerville, Massachusetts. He was on the stage for many years, appearing in important roles in London, New York and Chicago including as J. Offenbach Gaggs in The Casino Girl (1900) and Algy Cuffs in The Belle of Bohemia in London in 1901 before making his screen debut. In 1941 he died in North Hollywood, California from a heart attack.

Selected filmography

 Mary's Lamb (1915) - Leander Lamb
 The Mad Marriage (1925)
 Zander the Great (1925) - Mr. Pepper
 The Coming of Amos (1925) - David Fontenay
 Eve's Leaves (1926) - Richard Stanley
 The Understanding Heart (1927) - Sheriff Bentley
 Soft Cushions (1927) - The Slave Dealer
 The Fleet's In (1928) - Judge Hartley
 While the City Sleeps (1928) - Wally
 Habeas Corpus (1928, Short) - Professor Padilla
 It Can Be Done (1929) - Watson
 Madame X (1929) - Perissard
 His Glorious Night (1929) - Count Albert
 So This Is College (1929) - Entomology Professor (uncredited)
 Brothers (1929) - Thomas Blackwood
 The Grand Parade (1930) - Rand
 A Lady to Love (1930) - Postman
 Free and Easy (1930) - Eunuch Crowning Elmer (uncredited)
 The Unholy Three (1930) - Sideshow Barker (uncredited)
 Estrellados (1930) - Eunuch (uncredited)
 Sin Takes a Holiday (1930) - Minister (uncredited)
 Flying High (1931) - Hotel Manager (uncredited)
 Fireman, Save My Child (1932) - Dan Toby
 One Hour with You (1932) - Henri Dornier - Private Detective
 The Washington Masquerade (1932) - Dinner Guest (uncredited)
 The Night of June 13 (1932) - Otto
 Hat Check Girl (1932) - Professor (uncredited)
 Rockabye (1932) - Doc (uncredited)
 Smoke Lightning (1933) - Parson
 Private Jones (1933) - Lecturer (uncredited)
 Diplomaniacs (1933) - Ship's Captain
 Man Hunt (1933) - Sheriff Bascom
 No Marriage Ties (1933) - Peggy's Song Publisher Escort (uncredited)
 Morning Glory (1933) - Henry Lawrence
 Golden Harvest (1933) - Doctor Hoyt
 Ladies Must Love (1933) - Wilbur Muller
 Moulin Rouge (1934) - Sugar Daddy (uncredited)
 Beloved (1934) - Judge B. T. Belden
 Caravan (1934) - Majordomo
 George White's Scandals (1934) - Minister
 Harold Teen (1934) - Parmalee - School Official
 Bottoms Up (1934) - Party Guest (uncredited)
 Sing and Like It (1934) - Mr. Abercrombie Hancock - Critic
 The Witching Hour (1934) - Lew Ellinger
 The Last Round-Up (1934) - Judge Savin
 Affairs of a Gentleman (1934) - Paul Q. Bindar
 Hollywood Party (1934) - Knapp
 Such Women Are Dangerous (1934) - Thomas H. Delahanty
 The Old Fashioned Way (1934) - Sheriff of Barnesville
 Wake Up and Dream (1934) - Roger Babcock
 The Merry Widow (1934) - Defense Attorney (uncredited)
 The Ghost Walks (1934) - Herman Wood
 Life Returns (1935) - A.K. Arnold
 Home on the Range (1935) - Butts
 Night Life of the Gods (1935) - Grandpa Lambert
 Baby Face Harrington (1935) - Judge Forbes
 Love in Bloom (1935) - Sheriff
 Together We Live (1935) - Charlie
 Here Comes Cookie (1935) - Sam (uncredited)
 The Gay Deception (1935) - Mr. Spitzer
 Moonlight on the Prairie (1935) - Colonel Gowdy
 I Dream Too Much (1935) - Snobbish Critic (uncredited)
 Nevada (1935) - Judge Franklidge
 The Bride Comes Home (1935) - Frank - Butler
 Dangerous (1935) - Pitt Hanley
 Anything Goes (1936) - Bishop Dobson
 Drift Fence (1936) - Sheriff Bingham
 The Trail of the Lonesome Pine (1936) - Ezra Tolliver
 The Little Red Schoolhouse (1936) - The Professor, a Hobo
 Love Before Breakfast (1936) - Brinkerhoff
 Small Town Girl (1936) - Jeffers Cass, J.P. (uncredited)
 Let's Sing Again (1936) - Carter
 The Case Against Mrs. Ames (1936) - Uncle Gordon
 One Rainy Afternoon (1936) - Minister of Justice
 Three of a Kind (1936) - F. Thorndyke Penfield
 San Francisco (1936) - Founders' Club Member (uncredited)
 The Arizona Raiders (1936) - Boswell Albernathy, Justice of the Peace
 Spendthrift (1936) - Popsy
 The Texas Rangers (1936) - Casper Johnson
 The Man I Marry (1936) - Storekeeper
 Easy to Take (1936) - Attorney Olney
 Arizona Mahoney (1936) - Sheriff
 College Holiday (1936) - Judge Bent
 Champagne Waltz (1937) - Messenger (uncredited)
 She's Dangerous (1937) - Kegley
 Outcast (1937) - Mooney
 Top of the Town (1937) - Edwin Borden
 Racketeers in Exile (1937) - Regan Langdon aka 'Porky'
 The Man in Blue (1937) - Willie Loomis
 Married Before Breakfast (1937) - Colonel Eustace Randolph (uncredited)
 Rhythm in the Clouds (1937) - J.C. Boswell
 Love in a Bungalow (1937) - Mr. Bisbee
 It's All Yours (1937) - Judge Reynolds
 She Asked for It (1937) - Ted Hoyt
 Merry-Go-Round of 1938 (1937) - Col. J. Addison Frooks
 I'll Take Romance (1937) - Rudi
 45 Fathers (1937) - Bunny Carothers
 True Confession (1937) - Judge
 Persons in Hiding (1939) - Zeke (Pa) Bronson
 It's a Wonderful World (1939) - Major I.E. Willoughby
 Undercover Doctor (1939) - Elmer Porter
 Maisie (1939) - Roger Bannerman
 Ninotchka (1939) - Gaston
 Remember? (1939) - Mr. Piper
 Parole Fixer (1940) - Gustav Kalkus
 The Ghost Comes Home (1940) - John Reed Thomas
 Ma! He's Making Eyes at Me (1940) - C. J. Woodbury
 Lillian Russell (1940) - Bradley (uncredited)
 Those Were the Days! (1940) - Old Man (uncredited)
 The Great McGinty (1940) - Dr. Jonas J. Jarvis - Card Player in Cantina (uncredited)
 Comin' Round the Mountain (1940) - Lester Smoot
 The Golden Fleecing (1940) - Pattington
 Seven Sinners (1940) - District Officer
 One Night in the Tropics (1940) - James G. Moore
 Las Vegas Nights (1941) - Judge Elkins (uncredited)
 The Devil and Miss Jones (1941) - Oliver
 That Uncertain Feeling (1941) - The Butler
 Million Dollar Baby (1941) - George
 My Life with Caroline (1941) - Reverend Dr. Curtis (uncredited)
 A Dangerous Game (1941) - Agatha - alias Mooseface Hogarty
 New Wine (1941) - Karl Hasslinger
 Buy Me That Town (1941) - Judge Paradise
 Moonlight in Hawaii (1941) - J. B. Lawton

References

External links

Richard Carle papers, 1900-1941, held by the Billy Rose Theatre Division, New York Public Library for the Performing Arts

1871 births
1941 deaths
American male film actors
American male silent film actors
People from Somerville, Massachusetts
Male actors from Massachusetts
20th-century American male actors
American male dramatists and playwrights